Mt. Horeb Presbyterian Church and Cemetery is a historic Presbyterian church and cemetery located near Elizabethtown, Bladen County, North Carolina.  It was built in 1845, and is a frame Greek Revival-style church with a pedimented front portico added in 1932.

It was added to the National Register of Historic Places in 1987.

References

Presbyterian churches in North Carolina
Cemeteries in North Carolina
Protestant Reformed cemeteries
Churches on the National Register of Historic Places in North Carolina
Churches completed in 1845
19th-century Presbyterian church buildings in the United States
Churches in Bladen County, North Carolina
National Register of Historic Places in Bladen County, North Carolina